Malaikat Tanpa Sayap (English translation: Angel Without Wings), is an Indonesian drama film which released on February 9, 2012, which directed by Rako Prijanto. The film starred by Maudy Ayunda, Adipati Koesmadji, Ikang Fawzi, Surya Saputra, Agus Kuncoro, and Kinaryosih.

Cast
 Maudy Ayunda as Mura
 Adipati Koesmadji as Vino
 Ikang Fawzi as Levrand
 Surya Saputra as Amir
 Agus Kuncoro as Calo
 Kinaryosih as Mirna
 Geccha Qheagaveta as Wina

Awards and nominations

References

External links
 KapanLagi.com - 'MALAIKAT TANPA SAYAP', Menafsir Perwujudan Cinta

2012 films
Indonesian drama films
2012 drama films
Films directed by Rako Prijanto